Mounir Laroussi (born August 9, 1955) is a Tunisian-American scientist. He is known for his work in plasma science, especially low temperature plasmas and their biomedical applications.

Biography

Early life 
Mounir Laroussi was born and raised in Sfax, Tunisia, the son of Habib Laroussi and Manana Jeloul. He is the middle child of three siblings.

Education 
Laroussi attended the Alexander Dumas Elementary School and the Lycee Technique de Sfax (middle school and high school). He received his “Diplome d’Ingenieur” from the Ecole Nationale d’Ingenieurs de Sfax (ENIS) and completed his Master's equivalent thesis in 1981 at the Ecole Nationale Superieure d’ Electronique et de Radioelectricite de Bordeaux (ENSERB) in Bordeaux, France. In 1988, Laroussi received his PhD in electrical engineering from the University of Tennessee.

In 1995,  Laroussi joined the Microwave & Plasma Laboratory of the University of Tennessee as a Research Assistant Professor. In 1998, Laroussi joined Old Dominion University  as a Research Associate Professor in the Applied Research Center.  In 2003, he became an associate professor in the Electrical and Computer Engineering Department at Old Dominion. In 2008, Laroussi was appointed Full Professor.  He is currently a professor at the Electrical & Computer Engineering Department of ODU and is the Director of ODU’s Laser & Plasma Engineering Institute (LPEI).

Academic and scientific career 
Laroussi's research interests are in the Physical Electronics area, particularly in the applications of non-equilibrium gaseous discharges. Amongst these are the generation of large volume low temperature plasmas, the interaction of microwaves with plasmas, and the biomedical applications of cold plasmas, a field known as “Plasma Medicine”. In the latter, he published seminal papers on the interaction of low-temperature plasmas with biological cells. In plasma medicine research, low temperature plasmas (or simply cold plasmas) are used to inactivate bacteria and proteins, assist in wound care, destroy some types of cancer cells, and play an active role in various other medical therapies. In 2009 the Institute of Electric and Electronics Engineers (IEEE) elevated Laroussi to Fellow for his contributions to the biomedical applications of plasmas[3].

Laroussi's best-known invention is the Plasma Pencil. This device can generate long plumes or jets of cold plasmas that can be used in various biomedical applications, including in dentistry. The Plasma Pencil was the subject of wide media coverage including a mention in an article in National Geographic (February 2006 issue), and ABC online news.  It was featured in science/technology shows on the History Channel and the Smithsonian Channel.

Laroussi served as an elected member of the Administrative Committee (2002–2005) and the Plasma Science and Applications Executive Committee (2005–2007) of the IEEE Nuclear and Plasma Sciences Society (NPSS). He has also served as a Guest Editor of the IEEE Transactions on Plasma Science, and of Plasma Processes and Polymers, a Wiley-VCH journal. He serves as an IEEE-NPSS Distinguished Lecturer.

Awards 
 IEEE Millennium Medal, 2000
 Excellence in Research Award from the Batten College of Engineering and Technology, Old Dominion University, May 2005
 Excellence in Teaching Award from the Electrical and Computer Engineering Department, Old Dominion University, June 2006
 Excellence in Innovation Award from the Hampton Road Technology Council, May 2006
 Research Achievement Award, Old Dominion University, May 2009
 Achievement Award, International Society on Plasma Medicine, September 2010

Personal 
In addition to his scientific work, Laroussi writes short stories and is a soccer player and fan. He is fluent in Arabic, French, and English.

Selected publications

References

External links 
 Electrical & Computer Engineering
 https://web.archive.org/web/20110514230129/http://www.materialsviews.com/details/news/691711/A_Personal_View_of_Plasma_Medicine.html
 
 www.ece.odu.edu/~mlarouss/
 Killer Clothing Bursts Bad Bacteria
 Non-toxic way to sterilise equipment
 www.nature.com/news/2005/050919/full/news050919-13.html
 www.space.com/businesstechnology/technology/cold_plasma_000724.html
 Phys.org - News and Articles on Science and Technology
 https://web.archive.org/web/20100528000951/http://www.nae.edu/nae/pubundcom.nsf/weblinks/CGOZ-6QTJL9?OpenDocument

21st-century American inventors
21st-century American physicists
American plasma physicists
Living people
Old Dominion University faculty
People from Sfax
University of Tennessee alumni
1955 births